Xuluq (also, Khulukh) is a village and municipality in the Qusar Rayon of Azerbaijan.  It has a population of 369.  The municipality consists of the villages of Xuluq and Gilah.

The village itself is located on the altitude of 1100 meters above sea level. Khulukh is a monoethnic village, all the representers of the village are Lezgins.

References 

Populated places in Qusar District